Prabhadevi BMC School consist of Marathi, Semi-English, Hindi medium which is located in Mumbai, Maharashtra, India. There is Primary and Secondary both session available. Prabhadevi BMC School have class from 1st std to 10th std.

Prabhadevi English BMC School is located in Mumbai, Maharashtra, India, and run by Muktangan, a NGO located in Mumbai and funded by the Paragon Charitable Trust.

Schools in Mumbai